Palpoctenidia is a monotypic moth genus in the family Geometridae described by Prout in 1930. Its only species, Palpoctenidia phoenicosoma, was first described by Swinhoe in 1895. It is found in China, Japan and India.

Subspecies
Palpoctenidia phoenicosoma phoenicosoma (India, China)
Palpoctenidia phoenicosoma semilauta Prout, 1938 (Japan)

References

External links

Asthenini
Moths of Japan